State Road 153 (NM 153) is a  state highway in the US state of New Mexico. NM 153's southern terminus is at NM 211 in Gila, and the northern terminus is at the end of route north-northeast of Gila.

Major intersections

See also

References

153
Transportation in Grant County, New Mexico